Luis Alberto Nicolao (born June 28, 1944 in Buenos Aires) is a retired butterfly swimmer from Argentina, who in 1962 twice broke the world record in the men's 100 metres butterfly (long course).

World records 

Trained and coached by the winningest Argentinean coach "Profe" Alberto Carranza, Nicolao traveled to Rio de Janeiro with great help from a long time Carranza's friend "Pepe" Caraballo. Despite going too fast in the first 50 meters he broke Fred Schmidt’s world record at 58.4 in the salt water Guanabara pool on 24 April 1962. Carranza knew that Nicolao could go even faster if the first 50 meters were more measured, so he went back to Pepe Caraballo and others to assist and support their stay in Rio for a couple more days in order to try a second time. This resulted in a much better race and the world record was lowered to 57.0 on 27 April 1962. Five years later US swimmer Mark Spitz broke Nicolao's top time.

References
  Red Argentina Profile

1944 births
Living people
Argentine male swimmers
Argentine male butterfly swimmers
Olympic swimmers of Argentina
Swimmers at the 1960 Summer Olympics
Swimmers at the 1963 Pan American Games
Swimmers at the 1964 Summer Olympics
Swimmers at the 1967 Pan American Games
Swimmers at the 1968 Summer Olympics
Swimmers from Buenos Aires
World record setters in swimming
Pan American Games silver medalists for Argentina
Pan American Games bronze medalists for Argentina
Pan American Games medalists in swimming
Medalists at the 1963 Pan American Games
Medalists at the 1967 Pan American Games
20th-century Argentine people